K.Chettypatti  is a village in the  
Arimalamrevenue block of Pudukkottai district 
, Tamil Nadu, India.

Demographics 

As per the 2001 census, K.Chettypatti had a total population of  
2148 with 1069 males and 1079 females. Out of the total  
population 1043 people were literate.

References

Villages in Pudukkottai district